Lyons Motor Car is a US based automobile developer/manufacturer focused on creating "An American hyper performance sports car company" to compete with luxury European sports car companies. Lyons Motor Car was established in 2014 and is based in New York City. The company is developing their first vehicle, the LM2 Streamliner.

The company was founded by Kevin W. Lyons a Graphic Designer and automobile aficionado. Kevin Lyons flare for steel fabrication and customizing lead him to the completion of several notable show cars. These successes encouraged him to start his own exclusive automobile manufacturing company, in the direction of other small custom American automobile builders.

LM2 Streamliner (Streamliner Super Sport)
LM2 Streamliner ( Streamliner Super Sport )  is a full carbon fiber constructed vehicle with a mid mounted, dual overhead cam, 8.2 liter billet aluminum twin turbocharged V8 developed by Nelson Racing Engines in Chatsworth California.

Lyons Motor Car announced the all wheel drive LM2 Streamliner to have "1700 hp and 1610 lb. ft. torque" and the top speed estimated at 290 mph. It would accelerate from 0-60 MPH in 2.2 seconds with a 0 to 60 target of 1.96 seconds and 0-100 MPH in 4.1 seconds with a 3.51 sec target. LM2 Streamliner dimensions Length 181.9" in, Height 43.5" in, Width 78.5" in, Wheelbase 109.3" in.  Streamliner's are fitted with P375 30ZR21 rear tires and P285 30ZR20's front tires. The car uses a Haldex all wheel drive front differential with a 7 speed sequential gear box mounted in front, with the twin turbocharged V8 uniquely mounted with accessory drives facing rearward. The rear differential is a Strange Engineering 1320 9" G-Force S60 mounted offset in chassis.

It was originally supposed to debut during the 2015 New York International Auto Show, but the company claimed that it wasn't ready in time for the media press days. Company administrators debuted the non running concept model during the public days.
To date  2019-03-17 the company has made a serious efforts in completing their pre-production prototype.

The company has announced a 2020 new car model year launch for their LM2 Streamliner, which will be branded Streamliner Super Sport leaving the LM2 (Lyons Motors twin turbo) as a concept car.

The Streamliner Super Sport will gain an automatically retracting top similar to T tops of old. The tops will store under the deck lid in the engine bay.

The company plans a total 15 Streamliner Super Sports per year, with a continued Streamliner series of 25 cars per year with a maximum of 50 there after.

As of January 2018 the company expressed interest for offering a plug in electric option of the Streamliner called "Streamliner ELM (Electric Lyons Motors).This counterpart to the Streamliner Super Sport would feature 4 480 horsepower direct drive single pole motors driving each wheel independently, via vectored all wheel drive.

References

Car manufacturers of the United States